Tarian Rhyddid a Dymchwelydd Gormes (English: The Shield of Freedom Overthrows Oppression) was a 19th-century Welsh language periodical, produced for the Congregationalist Church by ministers William Rees (Gwilym Hiraethog, 1802–1883), one of the major Welsh literary figures of the 19th century, and Hugh Pugh (1803–1868). It contained mainly articles which attacked the Established Church, and protested against its practices (such as the collection of tithes).

References 

Periodicals published in Wales
Welsh-language magazines
Religious magazines published in the United Kingdom